General Carter may refer to:

Jesse McI. Carter (1863–1930), U.S. Army major general 
John C. Carter (1837–1864), Confederate States Army brigadier general
Joseph C. Carter (1970s–2010s), Massachusetts National Guard brigadier general
Marshall Carter (1909–1993), U.S. Army lieutenant general
Nick Carter (British Army officer) (born 1959), British Army general
Samuel P. Carter (1819–1891), Union Army brevet major general 
Thomas L. Carter (fl. 1990s–2020s), U.S. Air Force major general
William Harding Carter (1851–1925), U.S. Army major general

See also
George Carter-Campbell (1869–1921), British Army major general
Attorney General Carter (disambiguation)